Floyd Clark "Rip" Wheeler (March 2, 1898), in Marion, Kentucky – September 18, 1968) was an American major league baseball pitcher from 1921 to 1924 for the Pittsburgh Pirates and Chicago Cubs.

External links

1898 births
1968 deaths
Pittsburgh Pirates players
Chicago Cubs players
Baseball players from Kentucky
Major League Baseball pitchers
Minor league baseball managers
Columbus Foxes players
Memphis Chickasaws players
London Tecumsehs (baseball) players
Birmingham Barons players
Wichita Falls Spudders players
Rochester Tribe players
Evansville Hubs players
San Diego Padres (minor league) players
People from Marion, Kentucky